The Medway Valley line is the name given to the railway line linking  in the Medway Towns via  to . High Speed services also link between Maidstone West, Snodland, Strood and London St Pancras International (peak only). The section from Maidstone West to Paddock Wood passes through some of Kent's most picturesque countryside along the narrower sections of the River Medway.

History
The line was built in two stages by the South Eastern Railway (SER). The first stage opened on 24 September 1844 and was a branch off the SER's first main line that crossed Kent between the coast ports of Dover and Folkestone and the LBSCR's main line at Redhill. According to a contemporary report in The Times newspaper, the opening of the branch line was an attempt to convey hops and fruit traffic back to Maidstone, which was losing trade to various points along the Dover line. The junction was at Paddock Wood and followed the Medway Valley down to the county town of Maidstone that had been by-passed by the new main line. Twelve years later, on 18 June 1856 the extension of the line further down the Medway Valley was opened, to join the North Kent Line at Strood (which had opened in 1847). The extension was built by the railway contractor Edward Betts, who lived locally at Preston Hall and through whose estate the line partially passed. Betts arranged for his local station at Aylesford to be built in a much grander style than the other country stations along the line.

The SER started joint working with local rival London, Chatham and Dover Railway (LCDR) on 1 January 1899 under the name the South Eastern and Chatham Railway (SECR). Post World War One, the railways were "grouped" and the SECR became part of Southern Railway.

For a brief period in the 1990s some services were extended to  via
This involved reversing trains and switching tracks at Strood.

It was designated by the Department for Transport as a community rail service in September 2007.

Industry
The line served many rail connected industries, Aveling and Porter just south of Strood, cement works in the Cuxton, Halling and Snodland areas, a newsprint at New Hythe, Lafarge between Aylesford and Maidstone Barracks, Lockmeadow sidings at Maidstone West, Tovil goods depot and sand pits at Beltring

Infrastructure

Track

Stations

Signalling
During 2005, the signalling systems were upgraded, replacing the traditional semaphore signals with coloured light signals. Further modifications have since been made with the expansion of the North Kent Signalling Centre. The level crossing at Yalding has the only signal on the Southeastern network to display a flashing white light as the proceed aspect.

Electrification
The line from Strood to Maidstone West was electrified (at 750 V DC third rail) by the Southern Railway, opening on 2 July 1939. The rest of the line from Paddock Wood to Maidstone West was electrified under Stage 2 of Kent Coast electrification by BR's 1955 Modernisation Plan, opening to traffic on 18 June 1962.

Train services

Services are operated by SE Trains.

Trains typically run a half-hourly service between Strood and Maidstone, with one train per hour carrying on through to either Paddock Wood or Tonbridge. There is no longer an early morning service to London Bridge. During 2020, trains terminated at Paddock Wood instead of Tonbridge, while the Maidstone West to Strood shuttle runs only during peak hours (1 in each direction during the morning peak and 6 during the afternoon/evening). From 2021, the trains terminate at Tonbridge again. the trains only terminate at Paddock Wood at evening peak hours. There is also a special service at 22:34 every night from Tonbridge to Gillingham (Kent).

High-Speed introduction
On 18 March 2011, Southeastern announced the start of a new high-speed service from Maidstone to St Pancras International via Strood on a trial basis. During the morning rush hour, there are 2 trains from Maidstone West to St Pancras International, and 1 train heading in the opposite direction. In the evening rush hour, the services are reversed (2 trains to Maidstone West, and 1 trains to St Pancras International). Services in the opposite direction to the main flow do not call at Snodland and instead run non-stop from Maidstone West to Strood.

A trial service commenced on 23 May 2011 and comes as a result of changes on the North Kent line to improve punctuality of existing services. This service has since been made permanent.

Traction and rolling stock
The main rolling stock used on the line is 3 car Class 375/3 Electrostars.

Class 395 Javelins serve the line during Monday to Friday peak hours with high speed services from St. Pancras International to Maidstone West, with Snodland the only intermediate station it serves on the line.

Freight/Other
A variety of freight and other services frequent the line, including , as well as through traffic from Hoo Junction and Tonbridge yard.

Aggregates traffic also features, with destinations including Allington and Aylesford aggregates sidings.

References

Further reading

External links

http://www.kentrail.org.uk/medway_valley_line.htm – Map of the Medway Valley line (Strood to Paddock Wood)
https://web.archive.org/web/20081112101428/http://www.ordnancesurvey.co.uk/oswebsite/ – Ordnance Survey website

Rail transport in Kent
Community railway lines in England
Transport in Medway
Railway lines in South East England
Standard gauge railways in England
Railway lines opened in 1856
1856 in England